Matt Robert Lashoff (born September 29, 1986) is an American professional ice hockey defenseman who is currently playing with the SCL Tigers in the National League A (NLA).

Lashoff was selected by the Boston Bruins in the 1st round (22nd overall) of the 2005 NHL Entry Draft. He is the older brother of Detroit Red Wings defenseman, Brian Lashoff.

Playing career
As a youth, Lashoff played in the 2000 Quebec International Pee-Wee Hockey Tournament with the New York Rangers minor ice hockey team.

Lashoff prepped at Avon Old Farms School in Avon, Connecticut under famed coach John T. Gardner. He was drafted by the Boston Bruins in the first round, 22nd overall, in the 2005 NHL Entry Draft. After playing three seasons in the Ontario Hockey League with the Kitchener Rangers, Lashoff made his professional debut at the end of the 2005–06 season with the Bruins' American Hockey League affiliate, the Providence Bruins.

Lashoff made his NHL debut with the Boston Bruins in the 2006–07 season on October 26, 2006. Lashoff scored his first NHL goal December 31, 2007, against Kari Lehtonen of the Atlanta Thrashers.

On April 4, 2007, Lashoff was named to the 2006–07 AHL All-Rookie Team. On March 4, 2009, at the trade deadline for the 2008–09 season, Lashoff was traded by the Bruins, along with Mārtiņš Karsums, to the Tampa Bay Lightning for Mark Recchi and a 2009 second round draft pick.

On August 27, 2010, Lashoff was traded by the Lightning to the Toronto Maple Leafs in exchange for Alex Berry and Stefano Giliati.

On August 3, 2012, as a free agent, Lashoff signed a try-out contract with European team, ZSC Lions of the Swiss NLA.

After two and a half years abroad in Sweden and Russia, Lashoff left Metallurg Novokuznetsk of the Kontinental Hockey League mid-year in the 2014–15 season, to return to North America to sign an AHL contract for the remainder of the campaign with the Bridgeport Sound Tigers on January 12, 2015. Lashoff appeared in just 11 games with the Tigers before he was traded to the Portland Pirates in exchange for Dyson Stevenson on March 3, 2015.

Lashoff agreed to join the Lehigh Valley Phantoms to begin the season on October 5, 2015. In adding depth to the blueline, Lashoff appeared in 17 games for 2 assists before he was released from his contract. On February 2, 2016, Lashoff inked a contract for the remainder of the 2015–16 season with Adler Mannheim of the German top flight Deutsche Eishockey Liga. He appeared in 3 regular season games before suiting up in two post-season contests, contributing with a goal and 14 penalty minutes.

As a free agent in the following off-season, and having returned to North America from Germany, Lashoff trained and agreed to attend his former club, the Toronto Marlies training camp, in preparation for the 2016–17 season. He was released from his try-out during the pre-season on October 10, 2016. With the season underway, Lashoff belatedly agreed to a professional try-out contract with the San Antonio Rampage of the AHL, affiliate to the Colorado Avalanche, on October 26, 2016. In 19 games with the Rampage, Lashoff led the defense in scoring with 3 goals and 7 points. At the end of his try-out period, the Rampage however opted against another try-out contract concluding his tenure with the team on December 23, 2016. On February 3, 2017, he signed with the SCL Tigers of the National League A for the remainder of the 2016-17 season.

Music career
Lashoff is also a musician. He released his debut album titled "Living on Heart" on May 17, 2011. "Living on Heart" was recorded over a month in the summer of 2010, at various studios in New Jersey and New York, during Lashoff's off season. Producer Loren Harriet approached Lashoff after seeing a segment about his music career on the New England Sports Network channel. Lashoff was surprised by the opportunity and explains, "I didn't think [Harriet] was serious at first [but eventually] he was helping me choose my band which was like an all star team of some of the best studio musicians." Lashoff says his debut album is "bluesy with a pop influence" and cites artists such as Stevie Ray Vaughan, B.B. King and Kenny Wayne Shepherd as his inspiration.

"A lot of people ask me how do you separate the two, but they've always been a part of my lifestyle. When we were kids we would play hockey before school and then after school till it got too dark and our mom told us to come in, then we would eat, play around on the guitar and write songs," says Lashoff. He is now planning a second album with a different sound, that will be "more groove based and not so poppy."

Career statistics

Regular season and playoffs

Awards and honours

References

External links

 

1986 births
Living people
Adler Mannheim players
American men's ice hockey defensemen
Boston Bruins draft picks
Boston Bruins players
Bridgeport Sound Tigers players
Ice hockey players from New York (state)
Kitchener Rangers players
Lehigh Valley Phantoms players
Leksands IF players
Metallurg Novokuznetsk players
National Hockey League first-round draft picks
Norfolk Admirals players
People from Rensselaer County, New York
Portland Pirates players
Providence Bruins players
San Antonio Rampage players
SCL Tigers players
Tampa Bay Lightning players
Toronto Maple Leafs players
Toronto Marlies players
ZSC Lions players
Avon Old Farms alumni